Frank Mountford (30 March 1923 – 27 June 2006) was an English footballer who played in the Football League for Stoke City.

Career
Mountford was thought to be one of many local start players to emerge from the youth ranks at the Victoria Ground during the 1940s but Mountford was born in Askern near Doncaster and moved to Stoke-on-Trent as a young boy. He broke into the first team during World War II and became one of the finest servants the club have had. During the War league seasons Mountford played as a centre forward and scored 23 goals during the 1940–41 season and 20 in 1942–43.

He gradually began to move out to defence and by the time Football League had resumed he was able to play in a number of positions and his best season in a Stoke shirt came in 1950–51 season where he played in every match at centre back in place of Neil Franklin who had caused controversy by moving to Colombia. He was a committed player who was always involved in the thick of the action and often required the attention of the club doctor. He retired in 1958 after making 425 appearances (600 including war league) scoring 24 goals. After hanging up his boots he moved to the back room staff and served as the club trainer and then coach until 1978.

Career statistics
Source:

References

English footballers
Stoke City F.C. players
English Football League players
1923 births
2006 deaths
Association football utility players